Propiomarengo is a small genus of southern African jumping spiders that was first described by G. N. Azarkina and C. R. Haddad in 2020. The type species, Propiomarengo plana, was originally described under the name "Afromarengo plana", but was moved to a new genus in 2020 when a similar species was discovered in South Africa.  it contains only two species: P. foordi and P. plana.

See also
 Afromarengo
 List of Salticidae genera

References

Salticidae genera
Spiders of South Africa